Spiraea nipponica is a species of flowering plant in the family Rosaceae, native to the island of Shikoku, Japan.

The specific epithet nipponica means "Japanese".

Cultivars
The cultivar 'Snowmound'  has gained the Royal Horticultural Society's Award of Garden Merit.

References

Flora of Japan
nipponica
Plants described in 1886